Brent Reiber (born December 31, 1966) is a Swiss former ice hockey referee, who refereed in the Swiss National League A. Reiber was born in Lloydminster, Saskatchewan, Canada.

Career
He has officiated many international tournaments including the Winter Olympics.

References 

1966 births
Living people
Ice hockey people from Alberta
Swiss ice hockey officials
People from Lloydminster